Holy Virgin may refer to:

 The Holy Virgin, Mary
 Holy Virgin (song), single by Groove Coverage
 The Holy Virgin Mary, a 1996 painting by Chris Ofili